Barbodes amarus, known as the pait locally, was a species of cyprinid fish endemic to Lake Lanao in Mindanao, the Philippines. It was first identified from specimens collected from Lake Lanao in 1910 and 1922, and specimens were still present as recently as a 1982 survey of the lake. More recent surveys have failed to find species, and it is now considered extinct.

References 

Barbodes
Freshwater fish of the Philippines
Endemic fauna of the Philippines
Fauna of Mindanao
Fish described in 1924
Taxa named by Albert William Herre
Taxonomy articles created by Polbot